Encore un soir (meaning One More Night) is a fifteenth French-language and twenty-sixth studio album by Canadian singer Celine Dion, released by Sony Music Entertainment on 26 August 2016. It is her first French studio album since 2012's Sans attendre. Encore un soir features songs produced mainly by Humberto Gatica, Scott Price, Silvio Lisbonne, Zaho and Jacques Veneruso. The first single from the album, also titled "Encore un soir" was released on 24 May 2016 and topped the charts in Francophone countries. Encore un soir is Dion's first French album since 2005's On ne change pas released in the United States.

The album garnered positive reviews from music critics and became a commercial success. Encore un soir topped the charts in France, Canada, Belgium and Switzerland, and was certified Diamond in France, 2× Platinum in Canada and Platinum in Belgium and Switzerland. It became the best-selling album of 2016 in Belgium, the second best-selling album of 2016 in France (best-selling album by a female artist), the seventh best-selling album of 2016 in Switzerland and the eighth best-selling album in Canada (the only Francophone album on the list). Encore un soir also became Dion's first French-language album to appear on the US Billboard charts. It has sold over 1.5 million copies worldwide.

Background
In August 2015, Dion's manager, Aldo Giampaolo, announced that the singer will be releasing French and English language albums in 2016 and 2017, respectively. This French album will feature mainly new material, but will also contain a cover of Robert Charlebois', "Ordinaire", and a remastered version of "Trois heures vingt" which was originally released on the singer's 1984 studio album, Mélanie. On 19 May 2016, celinedion.com began revealing excerpts of the lyrics of the lead single, "Encore un soir", written by Jean-Jacques Goldman. The lead single was released on 24 May 2016. The cover art for the single was revealed on 17 May 2016, and is identical to the cover art for the album.

During a series of interviews with various news outlets that took place on 12 May 2016 at The Colosseum at Caesars Palace, Dion announced that the upcoming French album would be released in August 2016. On 1 July 2016, the track list for the album was released on various news websites, citing a standard edition with twelve tracks, and a deluxe version with fifteen. On 9 November 2015, celinedion.com began a contest which allowed for fans to submit a track to be selected for Dion to record for this album. On 2 December 2015, after more than 1000 votes, Dion's website announced that the winner of the contest was Daniel Picard, and his track titled, "À la plus haute branche" will be included on the album.

Content
Encore un soir was recorded between June 2015 and June 2016. In the middle of recording it, in January 2016, Dion's husband and manager, René Angélil died. The album was released over seven months later, in August 2016. Dion and Angélil's vision of a new collaboration with legendary French artist Jean-Jacques Goldman came to fruition with "Encore un soir", marking a long-awaited reunion, after over twelve years. Released as the lead single, the title track became a commercial and critical success. For the first time, the French artists Francis Cabrel and Serge Lama co-wrote a song for Dion ("Plus qu'ailleurs"). Jacques Veneruso, one of her most trusted collaborators in recent years, has written and composed a new song as well ("Si c'était à refaire"). Grand Corps Malade has once again, after Sans attendre, offered his poetry to this new album on "L'étoile" and "Les yeux au ciel". Dion also worked with new writers and producers. One of them was Zaho and LNT Musik (Ludovic Carquet and Therry Marie-Louise) who wrote and produced "Ma faille", "Tu sauras" and "À vous" (on the Deluxe edition). Other new partners include Florent Mothe and Mutine (Manon Romiti and Silvio Lisbonne) who wrote "L'étoile", "Les yeux au ciel" and "Le bonheur en face".

Dion wanted to pay tribute to Quebec rich musical repertoire by reinterpreting the classic Robert Charlebois song "Ordinaire". Marc Dupré also collaborated with Dion on this album on "Je nous veux" and "Toutes ces choses". Daniel Picard saw his song "À la plus haute branche" chosen from over 4,000 submissions following a contest launched on Dion's website. All these "Quebec" songs were produced by Humberto Gatica and Scott Price. Aside from "À vous", the Deluxe edition also includes "Ma force" written by Vianney and a remastered version of "Trois heures vingt", Dion's 1984 song. "Trois heures vingt" was recorded for the Mélanie album. It was featured on Encore un soir because Angélil was particularly fond of this song, which was played during his funeral service at exactly 3:20 pm, marking the commencement of the ceremony. It was also the song which opened Dion's Summer Tour 2016. Other songs from the album performed on this tour included "Encore un soir", "Ordinaire" and "À la plus haute branche" (in Canada).

Singles
"Encore un soir" was released as a lead single from the album on 24 May 2016. It garnered positive reviews from music critics and topped the charts in France, Quebec and the French-speaking part of Switzerland. It also reached top ten in Luxembourg and Belgium. On 12 August 2016, the audio of "Trois heures vingt" was uploaded on YouTube/Vevo. Next week, the song entered the chart in France at number 73. On 19 August 2016, the lyric video of this song was also released. On 11 October 2016, "L'étoile" was announced as the second single in Canada. In 2017, "L'étoile" was released as the third single in France and Belgium. On 14 October 2016, "Si c'était à refaire" was sent to radio stations in France and Belgium as the second single there. On 13 February 2017, "Je nous veux" was announced as the third single in Canada. "Les yeux au ciel" was released as the fourth single in France on 14 April 2017 and Canada in June 2017.

Promotion

In November 2015, Dion's official website announced first shows of her upcoming Summer Tour 2016. Dion toured Belgium, France and Canada between 20 June 2016 and 31 August 2016, and performed a total of twenty-eight shows. The sold-out tour garnered positive reviews, with Dion performing several songs never performed live before, mainly from the 1 fille & 4 types album. The setlist featured only few songs from the upcoming Encore un soir album: "Trois heures vingt", "Encore un soir", "Ordinaire" and "À la plus haute branche" (added in Canada). On 7 September 2016, Dion performed "Encore un soir" and "Les yeux au ciel" for the very first time on television on M6's Music Show – 100% tubes 2016 in France. On 1 October 2016, she also performed "Encore un soir" and "Les yeux au ciel" on Le Grand Show on France 2. Both shows were recorded in June 2016, while Dion was touring France. In the summer of 2017, Dion toured Europe with her Celine Dion Live 2017 concert tour.

Critical reception

Encore un soir received positive reviews from music critics. AllMusic gave it four out of five stars saying: "this album is one of the subtlest and most moving collections in her catalog."

Nicolas Houle from La Presse wrote that "Encore un soir", written by Jean-Jacques Goldman, comes with remarkable restraint and subtlety and is probably the strongest track on the album. He also praised "Ordinaire", originally sung by Robert Charlebois, and also two songs written by Grand Corps Malade ("L'étoile" and "Les yeux au ciel") and "À la plus haute branche" by Daniel Picard. Alain de Repentigny, from La Presse+ wrote that the album is orchestrated and praised "Plus qu'ailleurs" (written by Francis Cabrel and Serge Lama), "L'étoile" (an uptempo track with music by Florent Mothe and Mutine), "Encore un soir", "Je nous veux" and "Toutes ces choses" (both written by Marc Dupré), "Si c'était à refaire" (by Jacques Veneruso), "Tu sauras" (by Zaho) and "À la plus haute branche". Benjamin Locoge from Paris Match also wrote a positive review. He praised "Plus qu'ailleurs", "À la plus haute branche" and the feminine adaptation of "Ordinaire".

Accolades

On 26 September 2016, Dion was nominated for the NRJ Music Award in category Francophone Female Artist of the Year. On 18 October 2016, Encore un soir was nominated for the RTL Album of the Year. Encore un soir was also nominated for the Swiss Music Award in category Best International Album. It was nominated for two Juno Awards of 2017: Album of the Year and Adult Contemporary Album of the Year. In September 2017, Dion was nominated for four Félix Awards: Female Vocalist of the Year, Adult Contemporary Album of the Year, Best Selling Album of the Year and Most Popular Song of the Year ("Encore un soir"). The next month, Encore un soir won two Félix Awards for Adult Contemporary Album of the Year and Best Selling Album of the Year.

Commercial performance
The album became a commercial success. Encore un soir debuted at number one in France, selling 218,684 units. It has sold 216,555 copies (208,069 in physical sales and 8,486 in downloads), with 2,129 from streaming. Encore un soir became the album with the second-largest opening sales week of 2016 and also of the decade. In April 2016, Renaud debuted on the chart with 287,323 units sold. Before that, only Johnny Hallyday sold more in the first week. In November 2002, his album À la vie, à la mort ! sold 305,634 copies in France. With Encore un soir, Dion also achieved the biggest first week sales for a female artist in France. In its second week of release, the album stayed at number one selling 90,408 units (86,141 in sales and 4,267 in streaming), bringing the total to 309,092 units. After just two weeks, Encore un soir already became the third best-selling album of the year in France. In the third week in France, Encore un soir stayed at number one selling 
56,204 units (54,900 in sales and 1,304 in streaming), bringing the total to 358,900 units. In the fourth week, the album fell to number two selling 32,825 units (31,849 in sales and 975 in streaming), bringing the total to 391,725 units. However, it stayed at number one on the Physical Albums Chart in France. In the fifth week, Encore un soir returned to number one, selling 22,980 units (22,188 in sales and 792 in streaming). The next week, the album stayed at the top, selling 22,921 units (21,509 in sales and 1,412 in streaming), bringing the total to 437,626 units. In the seventh week, it stayed at number one, selling 18,806 units (17,590 in sales and 1,216 in streaming).

The next week, Encore un soir fell to number three, selling 14,521 units (13,152 in sales and 1,369 in streaming), bringing the total to 470,953 units (463,884 in pure sales and 7,069 in streaming). In the ninth week, the album fell to number eight selling 11,155 copies. In the tenth week it rose to number seven and sold 9,329 copies. In the next week Encore un soir fell to number eight selling 9,408 copies. After eleven weeks the album had sold 503,105 units in France (493,776 in pure sales and 9,329 from streaming). On 11 November 2016, it was certified Diamond for sales of over 500,000 copies. In the twelfth week Encore un soir fell to number ten selling 8,588 copies and bringing the total pure sales (without streaming) to 502,364 units. In the thirteenth week, the album fell out of top ten (number twelve) selling 8,078 copies and bringing the total pure sales (without streaming) to 510,442 units. The next week, it rose to number eleven selling 10,700 units. In the fifteenth week, the album returned to the top ten reaching number seven and selling 19,507 copies. The next week, Encore un soir rose to number five selling 31,866 copies and bringing the total pure sales (without streaming) to 572,515 units. In the seventeenth week, the album moved to number three selling 48,398 copies and bringing the total pure sales (without streaming) to 620,913 units. In the last week of 2016, Encore un soir moved up to number two and has sold 27,493 copies. Encore un soir became the second best-selling album of 2016 in France, with sales of 662,047 copies. In the two first weeks of 2017, the album has sold 7,103 copies (at number five) and 4,955 units (number seven). In the third week of 2017, Encore un soir fell to number thirteen.

In Canada, the album debuted at number one, selling 60,175 copies, including 57,085 in Quebec alone. It became Dion's fifteenth number-one album in Canada. It also topped the chart in Quebec. In the first week in Quebec, Encore un soir sold three times more copies than the rest of ninety-nine albums inside the Quebec Top 100 Albums Chart. Encore un soir stayed at number one in the second week in Canada and Quebec, selling 20,000 copies (18,797 in Quebec alone). In the third week in Canada, Encore un soir remained at number one selling 11,000 copies (12,000 in total consumption units). With Encore un soir Dion achieved her longest run at number one in Canada since 2007's Taking Chances. In the fourth week, Encore un soir slipped to third place, despite maintaining its hold as the number-one best-seller of the week, with 5,400 copies purchased. The albums at number one and two generated more streams in the week as Billboards Canadian Albums Chart became a consumption chart and includes also on-demand streaming.

In the fifth week, Encore un soir fell to number five on Billboards Canadian Albums Chart and slipped from the top to number three on the Canadian Albums Sales Chart. The next week, the album fell to number six on the Canadian Albums Chart but rose to number two on the Sales Chart. In the seventh week, it fell to number ten on the Canadian Albums Chart and number seven on the Sales Chart, selling 3,153 copies. After seven weeks, the album has sold 108,846 copies in Canada, including 102,858 units in Quebec alone. In the eight week, it fell to number thirteen on the Canadian Albums Chart and rose to number six on the Sales Chart. The next week, Encore un soir fell to number twenty-six on the Canadian Albums Chart and number sixteen on the Sales Chart. In the tenth week, it fell to number thirty-two on the Canadian Albums Chart and number nineteen on the Sales Chart. In Quebec, after nine weeks at the top, Encore un soir fell to number four. As of 2 December 2016, the album has sold 127,700 copies in pure sales in Canada. Encore un soir became the eight best-selling album of 2016 in Canada, with sales of 140,000 units (134,000 in pure sales).

Encore un soir also peaked at number one in both the Flanders and Wallonia regions of Belgium and Switzerland, number three in Italy, number six in Poland number seven in the Netherlands, number thirteen in Portugal, number fifteen in Austria, number sixteen in Germany, number eighteen in Spain, number twenty in Hungary, number thirty-two in Greece, and number fifty-eight in Korea. In the United Kingdom, it debuted at number eighty-eight on the Official Albums Chart, which includes physical and digital sales and audio streaming, and at number fifty-six on the Official Albums Sales Chart, which includes physical and digital sales (also at number sixty on the Official Physical Albums Chart and number sixty-five on the Official Album Downloads Chart). It also debuted at number seventy in Scotland.

Encore un soir became Dion's first French-language album to enter the Billboard charts in the United States. It debuted at number eighty-two on the Top Current Albums, number ninety-six on the Top Album Sales and number one on the World Albums chart. The album was certified Diamond in France, two-times Platinum in Canada and Platinum in Belgium and Switzerland. In 2016 alone, Encore un soir has sold 1.1 million copies around the world. As of October 2017, the albums has sold over 1.5 million copies worldwide.

Track listingNotes'
 signifies an additional producer

Personnel
Adapted from AllMusic.

 John Arnold – violin
 Guy Bélanger – harmonica
 Marc Bercovitz – direction
 Thierry Blanchard – instrumentation, piano, programmer, realization
 Jascha Bordon – cello
 Francis Cabrel – guitar
 Ludovic Carquet – bass, clavier, programmer, realization
 Vinnie Colaiuta – drums
 Flavien Compagnon – piano
 Celine Dion – lead and background vocals
 Élisabeth Dubé – cello
 Phillippe Dunnigan – violin
 Nathan East – bass
 Jennifer Eriksson – violin
 Bram Faber – viola
 Peppe "Squared" Folliero – mixing
 Humberto Gatica – choir and chorus, engineer, mixing, realization, recording
 Eric Giausserand – trumpet
 Christine Giguère  – cello
 Kaven Girouard – acoustic guitar
 Jean-Jacques Goldman – arranger, realization
 Mark Gray – assistant
 Simon Hale – fender rhodes, piano
 Patrick Hampartzoumian – drums, percussion, programmer, realization
 Earl Harvin – drums
 Annemarie Hensens – viola
 Marije De Jong – cello
 Michaël Joussein – trombone
 Rob Katz – assistant
 Yves Labonté – bass
 Luc Leroy – clavier, piano, programmer
 Silvio Lisbonne – bass, clavier, drums, executive producer, fender rhodes, acoustic guitar, electric guitar, keyboard programming, percussion, piano, production executive, programmer, realization
 Yann Macé – clavier, drums, mixing, percussion
 Ars Magna – design
 Alix Malka – photography
 Therry Marie-Louise – bass, clavier, programmer, realization
 Eddy Marnay – realization
 Vincent Martinez – guitar
 Guy Matteoni – arranger
 Vlado Meller – mastering
 Valérie Michelin – production executive
 Hinse Mutter – cello
 Everton Nelson – leader
 Martin Nessi – assistant, choir and chorus, engineer, mixing, percussion, recording
 Dean Parks – dobro, acoustic guitar
 Jason Patterson – assistant
 Yanna Pelser – viola
 Tim Pierce – acoustic guitar, electric guitar
 Eddy Pradelles – acoustic guitar
 Scott Price – arranger, clavier, piano, realization
 Patrice Pruneau – assistant
 Rebecca Ramsey – violin
 Paul Richard – percussion
 Pierre-Luc Rioux – guitar, acoustic guitar, electric guitar
 Thérèse Ryan – cello
 Denis Savage – engineer, recording
 Yannick Soccal – tenor saxophone
 Michael Thompson – acoustic guitar, electric guitar
 Giorgio Tuinfort – piano
 Franck van der Heijden – arranger, percussion, programmer
 Jacques Vénéruso – guitar, realization
 Tiborg – electric guitar, drums, keyboards, programmer, additional producer, recording (guitar, bass, keyboards)

Charts

Weekly charts

Year-end charts

Certifications and sales

Release history

See also
List of number-one albums of 2016 (Canada)
List of number-one hits of 2016 (France)
List of number-one hits of 2016 (Switzerland)

References

External links

2016 albums
Celine Dion albums
French-language albums